Geoffrey Palmer may refer to:

Politicians
Sir Geoffrey Palmer, 1st Baronet (1598–1670), English lawyer and politician
Sir Geoffrey Palmer, 3rd Baronet (1655–1732), English politician, Member of Parliament (MP) for Leicestershire
Geoffrey Palmer (MP) (1642–1661), briefly Member of Parliament for Ludgershall
Geoffrey Palmer (politician) (born 1942), New Zealand politician and lawyer, Prime Minister of New Zealand, 1989–1990

Others
Geoffrey Palmer (actor) (1927–2020), English actor
Geoff Palmer (footballer) (born 1954), English footballer
Geoff Palmer (scientist) (born 1940), professor of grain science
Geoffrey Palmer (real estate developer), American real estate developer
Geoffrey Molyneux Palmer (1882–1957), Irish composer
Geoff Palmer (musician) (born 1980), pop punk and folk punk musician
Geoffrey Palmer, co-wrote the Huey Lewis and the News song "Couple Days Off"

See also 
Jeffrey D. Palmer, Professor at Indiana University, Bloomington